President Smith may refer to:
Anthony Smith (politician), Republican president of the West Virginia Senate
George Albert Smith (1870–1951), president of the LDS Church
James Skivring Smith (1825–1892), 6th president of Liberia
Joseph F. Smith (1838–1918), president of the LDS Church
Joseph Fielding Smith (1876–1972), president of the LDS Church
John Augustine Smith (1782–1865), president of the College of William and Mary
W. Wallace Smith (1900–1989), president of the LDS Church and son of Joseph F. Smith